Ken Decaria (born November 5, 1953) is a Democratic member of the Wyoming Senate, representing the 15th district since 1999. He previously served in the Wyoming House of Representatives from 1997 through 1998.

External links
Wyoming State Legislature - Senator Ken Decaria official WY Senate website
Project Vote Smart - Senator Ken Decaria (WY) profile
Follow the Money - Ken Decaria
2006 2004 20021998 1996 campaign contributions

Democratic Party Wyoming state senators
Democratic Party members of the Wyoming House of Representatives
1953 births
Living people
Politicians from Ogden, Utah